Tim Mason may refer to:

Timothy Mason (1940–1990), British historian
Timothy Mason (clockmaker) (1695–1734), English clockmaker
Tim Mason (bowls) (born 1974), Canadian lawn bowler  
Tim Mason (cricketer) (born 1975), English cricketer 
Timothy Mason (playwright), American playwright